"Steh auf, wenn du am Boden bist" (Get up when you're on the ground) is a song by Die Toten Hosen. It's the third single and the thirteenth track from the album Auswärtsspiel.

Campino has stated that the reason behind this song is that he had a line like "Walk on with hope in your heart" in his head and it didn't seem weird in English and what he wanted was to create something similar.

An English version, titled "Stand Up", was recorded for the soundtrack of Land of Plenty.

Music video
The music video was directed by Olaf Heine.

The video is black-and-white and shows the band performing the song, which is interspersed with clips of depressed people, who start to smile as the song is nearing the end.

Track listing
 "Steh auf, wenn du am Boden bist" (von Holst/Frege) − 3:51
 "Leben im Bildausschnitt" (Life in a picture detail) (Meurer/Frege) – 3:05
 "Dankbar - Live" (Grateful) (Breitkopf, von Holst/Frege) − 2:46
 "Call of the Wild - Live" (Breitkopf/Frege, T.V. Smith) − 3:11

Charts

2002 singles
Die Toten Hosen songs
Songs written by Campino (singer)
Songs written by Andreas von Holst